Arsirrhyncha is a monotypic moth genus in the family Xyloryctidae. Its only species, Arsirrhyncha fibriculata, is found in the former Orientale Province of the Democratic Republic of the Congo. Both the genus and species were first described by Edward Meyrick in 1938.

References

Xyloryctidae
Monotypic moth genera
Taxa named by Edward Meyrick
Moths of Africa
Xyloryctidae genera